Navdeep Suri (born 1959) is a retired Indian diplomat  completing distinguished 36 years in the Indian Foreign Service, having served in India's diplomatic missions in Cairo, Damascus, Washington, Dar es Salaam and London and as India's Consul General in Johannesburg. He has also headed the West Africa and Public Diplomacy departments at the Ministry of External Affairs. He was India's High Commissioner to Australia and Ambassador to Egypt and UAE. In a rare gesture, the President of UAE conferred on him the Order of Zayed II, the country's second-highest civilian award. His innovative use of social media in public diplomacy in 2010 also received extensive recognition and two prestigious awards.
Navdeep has learnt Arabic and French, has a master's degree in Economics and has written on India's Africa policy, on Public Diplomacy and on the IT outsourcing industry. His English translations of his grandfather Nanak Singh's classic Punjabi novels have been published by Penguin as ‘The Watchmaker’ and by HarperCollins as ‘A Life Incomplete’ and ‘Khooni Vaisakhi’.
Navdeep is accompanied by his wife Mani who has a degree in Economics and is now an accomplished graphic designer and potter. They have two daughters, a journalist and an avid environmentalist.

Early life and background
Suri was born in Amritsar in the north Indian state of Punjab in 1959. He is the grandson of acclaimed Punjabi novelist and poet Nanak Singh. His father Kulwant Singh runs a reputed publishing house in Amritsar and his mother Attarjit has taught Punjabi language to college students. He did his schooling from St. Francis School. He then completed his master's degree in economics from Guru Nanak Dev University, Amritsar.

Career

Early diplomatic career
Suri joined the Indian Foreign Service in 1983 and has served in India's diplomatic missions in Cairo, Damascus, Washington DC, Dar es Salaam and London and as India's Consul General in Johannesburg.

Joint Secretary in Ministry of External Affairs
He has later headed the West Africa and Public Diplomacy divisions at the Ministry of External Affairs at New Delhi as a Joint Secretary. His tenure as Joint Secretary of Public Diplomacy divisions is particularly distinguished for his effort to create MEA's improved interaction with citizens through use of social media platforms and Internet.

Ambassador to Egypt
Suri's stint as Indian Ambassador to Egypt started in June 2012. As the Ambassador to Egypt his major challenge was a successful March 2013 state Visit of Egypt's President Mohamed Morsi to India. Morsi visited India from the 18 to 21 March 2013 as the head of a high-level delegation of Egyptian ministers and business leaders, at a time when trade between these two countries has witnessed a record 30 percent jump.

High Commissioner to Australia
On 26 February 2015, Indian Ministry of External Affairs announced its decision to appoint Suri as India's next High Commissioner to Australia, through a press brief. In April 2015, Suri arrived in Canberra, Australia.

Awards and decorations

Foreign honours
:
 First Class of the Order of Zayed II (12 September 2019)

Personal life
Suri is married to Mani, who has a degree in Economics and is an accomplished graphic designer and potter. The couple have two daughters.

Works
Suri has translated three of his grandfather Nanak Singh's classical Punjabi novels to English.
 Singh, Nanak and Navdeep Suri (trans.). Saintly Sinner. A 'n' B Publishers, 2003. 
 Singh, Nanak and Navdeep Suri (trans.). The Watchmaker. Penguin India, 2009. 
 Singh, Nanak and Navdeep Suri (trans.). A Life Incomplete. HarperCollins India, 2012. 
 Singh, Nanak and Navdeep Suri (trans.). Khooni Vaisakhi: A Poem from the Jallianwala Bagh Massacre, 1919. Harper Perennial, 2019.

References

External links

 The High Commission of India in Australia Official website.
 About Suri
 Ambassador's Official Blog, Embassy of India in Cairo, Egypt

Living people
1959 births
Ambassadors of India to the United Arab Emirates
High Commissioners of India to Australia
Ambassadors of India to Egypt
Indian Foreign Service officers